Strathmore Law School (SLS) is one of the constituent schools of Strathmore University, a non-profit private university in Nairobi, Kenya. The school launched on April 28, 2012.

References

External links 
Official website

Law schools in Africa
Strathmore University
Private universities and colleges in Kenya
Educational institutions established in 2012
2012 establishments in Kenya